Uchastok №4 is a rural locality (a settlement) in Shaninskoye Rural Settlement, Talovsky District, Voronezh Oblast, Russia. The population was 216 as of 2010. There are 7 streets.

References 

Rural localities in Talovsky District